Marion Davis Berdecio (1922 - 2006), born Marion Davis, was a recruit of the Soviet intelligence in the United States.

Career
Berdecio worked on the staff of the Office of Naval Intelligence at the US embassy in Mexico City and was one of several people recruited to assist Soviet intelligence during World War II by Flora Wovschin, her classmate at Barnard College.  She was later transferred to the Office of the Coordinator of Inter-American Affairs (CIAA) in Washington DC. Her recruitment by Wovschin is documented in three Venona project decrypts. Russian archives in Moscow also show the KGB querying the Comintern for information on Davis.

Personal life 
Wife of Roberto Berdecio.

Works 
  
National Chamber of Industry of Transformation (CANACINTRA) :es:CANACINTRA
 
 Andre Gunder Frank (1972) Lumpenbourgeoisie, Lumpendevelopment. Monthly Review Press. (tr. Marion Davis Berdecio)

References

Bibliography 
 Klehr, Harvey, John Earl Haynes, and Fridrikh Igorevich Firsov, The Secret World of American Communism (New Haven: Yale University Press, 1995)
 Klehr, Harvey, and John Earl Haynes. Venona: Decoding Soviet Espionage in America. (New Haven: Yale University Press, 1999)

External links 
 https://www.archives.gov/files/research/jfk/releases/124-10313-10012.pdf
 https://archive.org/details/CoplonJudithHQ10

1922 births
2006 deaths
Barnard College alumni
American spies for the Soviet Union
American people in the Venona papers
People of the Office of Naval Intelligence